Lake Don Pedro is a census-designated place (CDP) in Mariposa County, California. As of the 2020 United States census, the population was 1,765.

Geography
The community occupies the northwestern corner of Mariposa County, bordered to the north and west by Tuolumne County and to the southwest by Merced County. The CDP extends east to the shore of Lake McClure, a reservoir on the Merced River.

California State Route 132 passes through the northern parts of the community, leading east  to Coulterville and west  to La Grange.

Demographics

The 2010 United States Census reported that Lake Don Pedro had a population of 1,077. The racial makeup of Lake Don Pedro was 979 (90.9%) White, 7 (0.6%) African American, 18 (1.7%) Native American, 12 (1.1%) Asian, 2 (0.2%) Pacific Islander, 18 (1.7%) from other races, and 41 (3.8%) from two or more races. Hispanic or Latino of any race were 109 persons (10.1%).

The Census reported that 1,077 people (100% of the population) lived in households, 0 (0%) lived in non-institutionalized group quarters, and 0 (0%) were institutionalized.

There were 441 households, out of which 104 (23.6%) had children under the age of 18 living in them, 299 (67.8%) were opposite-sex married couples living together, 20 (4.5%) had a female householder with no husband present, 13 (2.9%) had a male householder with no wife present.  There were 23 (5.2%) unmarried opposite-sex partnerships, and 3 (0.7%) same-sex married couples or partnerships. 83 households (18.8%) were made up of individuals, and 34 (7.7%) had someone living alone who was 65 years of age or older. The average household size was 2.44.  There were 332 families (75.3% of all households); the average family size was 2.76.

The population was spread out, with 200 people (18.6%) under the age of 18, 56 people (5.2%) aged 18 to 24, 182 people (16.9%) aged 25 to 44, 427 people (39.6%) aged 45 to 64, and 212 people (19.7%) who were 65 years of age or older.  The median age was 50.2 years. For every 100 females, there were 107.5 males.  For every 100 females age 18 and over, there were 106.4 males.

The homeowner vacancy rate was 6.2%; the rental vacancy rate was 3.9%.  882 people (81.9% of the population) lived in owner-occupied housing units and 195 people (18.1%) lived in rental housing units.

References

Census-designated places in Mariposa County, California
Census-designated places in California